The following is a timeline of the history of the city of Irving, Texas, USA.

20th century

 1903 - Irving founded by real estate developers Julius Otto Schulze and Otis Brown.
 1904
 Post Office relocated to Irving from nearby Kit settlement.
 First Baptist Church of Irving founded.
 Irving Index newspaper begins publication (approximate date).
 1909 - Irving Independent School District established.
 1914
 Town of Irving incorporated.
 Otis Brown becomes mayor.
 1920 - Population: 357.
 1940 - Population: 1,089.
 1941 - Public library opens.
 1951 - Irving Theater in business.
 1952 - City of Irving incorporated.
 1955 - Plymouth Park Shopping Center in business.
 1956 - Catholic University of Dallas established in Irving.
 1960
 Irving Daily News Texan in publication.newspaper begins publication (approximate date).
 Population: 45,985.
 1964
 "Trucking terminal" built.
 Irving Community Hospital opens.
 Park Plaza Drive-In cinema in business.
 1970 - Population: 97,260.
 1971 - Texas Stadium opens.
 1973 - Las Colinas neighborhood created.
 1974 - Dallas-Fort Worth Regional Airport begins operating.
 1977 - North Lake College established.
 1978 - Irving Heritage Society formed.
 1981 - Irving city archives established.
 1985 - August 2: Airplane crash occurs.
 1990
 Exxon Mobil Corporation headquarters relocated to Irving from New York.
 Population: 155,037.
 1991 - Sam Johnson becomes U.S. representative for Texas's 3rd congressional district.
 1998 - City website online (approximate date).
 2000 - December 24: Robbery of Oshman's Sporting Goods by the "Texas Seven" criminals

21st century

 2003 - City centennial observed.
 2010
 April 11: Texas Stadium dismantled.
 Population: 216,290.
 2011
 Irving Convention Center at Las Colinas opens.
 Beth Van Duyne elected mayor.
 2012 - Dallas Area Rapid Transit light rail begins operating.
 2013 - Marc Veasey becomes U.S. representative for Texas's newly created 33rd congressional district.
 2015 - September 14: Ahmed Mohamed clock incident.

See also
 Irving history
 List of mayors of Irving, Texas
 Timelines of other cities in the North Texas area of Texas: Arlington, Dallas, Denton, Fort Worth, Garland, Plano, Wichita Falls

References

Bibliography
 
 Joseph Rice. Irving: A Texas Odyssey. Windsor Publications, Inc., 1989.
 Karen Sykes and Jeffery S. Covington. Irving: The Spirit and Dreams of Tomorrow. Atlanta: Longstreet Press, 1994.
 
  2007-

External links

 
 Items related to Irving, Texas, various dates (via Digital Public Library of America)
 

Irving
Irving, Texas